Zanoni is an 1842 novel by Edward Bulwer-Lytton.

Zanoni may also refer to:

Places 
 Zanoni, Missouri, United States
 Zanoni, Virginia, United States

People 
 Agustín Zanoni (born 1966), Argentine rugby union player
 Andrea Zanoni (born 1965), Italian politician
 Denis Zanoni (born 1941), Australian rules footballer
 Francesco Zanoni (died 1782), Italian painter
 Ludovic Zanoni (1935–2021), Romanian Olympic cyclist 
 Swian Zanoni (1988–2011), Brazilian motocross rider

Other uses 
 Zanoni (1865), a ship lost in South Australia in 1867